Amiruldin Asraf is a Singaporean footballer who plays for Home United as a striker.  He was the prime league top scorer in 2016 and was promoted to the senior team in 2017.

He is the son of ex-Singapore striker Nordin Khalil.  He is also part of the 2013 Lions City Cup, representing Singapore in the tournament. He studied at Loyang Secondary School.

Club career

Home United
After graduating from the NFA squad, he moved to play for the Home United Prime League squad.  He finished as the top scorer in the 2016 prime league scoring 16 goals in 24 league appearances and was promoted to the main squad in 2017. In his debut season, he scored 6 goals in 20 league appearances for his new team. In November 2017 he was awarded the S.League best local young player of the year award. It was announced in December 2017 that Assad have sign a new 2 year's contract with Home United, committing his future with the club to 2020. In June 2018, he was awarded the man of the match award for his outstanding display against Young Lions FC, where he scored  his first career hat trick and assisted Song Ui-young in the closing minutes to lead his club to a 4–0 victory. He finished the 2018 season with 8 goals in 21 league appearances.

International career
He represented the National Team in various level since his young days.  He also represented Singapore U21 team who played against Hong Kong U21 in 2016.

He also represented the team in the 2015 AFFU19 Youth Championship.

Club career statistics
As of 3 Mar 2020

Notes

International statistics

U22 International caps

U22 International goals

U19 International caps

Honours

International
Singapore U22
 Merlion Cup: 2019

References

Singaporean footballers
1997 births
Living people
Home United FC players
Singapore Premier League players
Association football forwards
Competitors at the 2017 Southeast Asian Games
Lion City Sailors FC players
Southeast Asian Games competitors for Singapore